The Oregon Coliseum is an art deco facility in the Ogle County, Illinois county seat of Oregon. It stands on the edge of the Oregon Commercial Historic District as a contributing structure to the overall integrity of the historic district. The coliseum was constructed in 1922 by the City of Oregon as city leaders sought to increase entertainment offerings in the city.

Notes

Buildings and structures in Oregon Commercial Historic District
Art Deco architecture in Illinois
Historic district contributing properties in Illinois
Event venues on the National Register of Historic Places in Illinois